DXAS may refer to:
 DXAS-AM, an AM radio station broadcasting in Zamboanga City
 DXAS-FM, an FM radio station broadcasting in Bongao, branded as Radyo Pilipinas